The 2015 Guia Race of Macau was the final showdown of the 2015 TCR International Series season as well as the fourth and final ever of the 2015 TCR Asia Series season. It took place on 22 November at the Guia Circuit.

Robert Huff won the first race, starting from pole position, driving a Honda Civic Type R TCR (FK2), and Stefano Comini gained the second one, driving a SEAT León Cup Racer.

The Swiss driver won the title, finishing also third in race 1.

Success Ballast
Due to the results obtained in the previous round, Pepe Oriola and Munkong Sathienthirakul received +30 kg, Stefano Comini and Tin Sritrai +20 kg and Jordi Gené and Kevin Pu +10 kg. Nevertheless, Sathienthirakul, Sritrai and Pu did not take part at this event, so they didn't take the ballast, whereas Frank Yu took the +20 kg from the Singapore round.

Classification

Qualifying

Notes:
 – Frank Yu was given a three-position grid penalty for ignoring yellow flags during free practice.
 – James Nash, Kenneth Lau, Michael Choi, Guillaume Cunnington, Keith Chan and Samson Chan were moved to the back of the grid for having not set a time within the 107% limit. The grid order was decided by the free practice combined classification.
 – Sam Lok, Johnson Huang and Douglas Khoo failed to set a lap time within 107% of the fastest time during the weekend. As a result, these drivers failed to qualify for the race.

Race 1

Race 2

Notes:
 – Jordi Oriola was given a 20-second penalty for having passed the pit lane exit line.

Standings after the event

Drivers' Championship standings

Teams' Championship standings

 Note: Only the top five positions are included for both sets of drivers' standings.

References

External links
TCR International Series official website

Macau
TCR International Series
TCR International Series, Macau